The Massachusetts House of Representatives is the lower house of the Massachusetts General Court, the state legislature of the Massachusetts. It is composed of 160 members elected from 14 counties each divided into single-member electoral districts across the Commonwealth. The House of Representatives convenes at the Massachusetts State House in Boston, the state capital of Massachusetts.

Qualifications
Any person seeking to get elected to the Massachusetts House of Representatives must meet the following qualifications:
 Be at least eighteen years of age
 Be a registered voter in Massachusetts
 Be an inhabitant of the district for at least one year prior to election
 Receive at least 150 signatures on nomination papers

Representation
Originally, representatives were apportioned by town. For the first 150 persons, one representative was granted, and this ratio increased as the population of the town increased. The largest membership of the House was 749 in 1812 (214 of these being from the District of Maine); the largest House without Maine was 635 in 1837. The original distribution was changed to the current regional population system in the 20th century. Until 1978, there were 240 members of the house, a number in multi-member districts; today there are 160 in single-member districts.

Districts are named for the counties they are in and tend to stay within one county, although districts often cross county lines.  Representatives serve two-year terms which are not limited.

The Sacred Cod

Within the House's debating chamber hangs the Sacred Cod of Massachusetts. The  pine carving of the cod was offered by Representative John Rowe in 1784 in commemoration of the state's maritime economy and history. Two previous carvings of the cod existed during the legislature's colonial era; the first destroyed in a fire in 1747, and the second during the American War of Independence. Since 1784, the current Sacred Cod has been present at nearly every House session, and moved to its current location when the House began convening in the State House in 1798.

In 1933, members of the Harvard Lampoon stole the cod carving as part of a prank. The theft sparked a large statewide search by the Boston and Massachusetts State Police. Following outrage from Boston newspapers and the General Court itself, the cod was anonymously handed back.

Composition
The Democrats hold a supermajority in the House.

Leadership 

The Speaker of the House presides over the House of Representatives. The Speaker is elected by the majority party caucus followed by confirmation of the full House through the passage of a House Resolution. As well as presiding over the body, the Speaker is also the chief leader, and controls the flow of legislation. Other House leaders, such as the majority and minority leaders, are elected by their respective party caucuses relative to their party's strength in the House.

Current leaders

Current members and districts

Current committees and members

Past composition of the House of Representatives

See also
 2023–2024 Massachusetts legislature
 List of current Massachusetts House of Representatives committees
 List of speakers of the Massachusetts House of Representatives
 Massachusetts State House
 Massachusetts Senate
 Massachusetts General Court
 List of former districts of the Massachusetts House of Representatives
 List of members of the colonial Massachusetts House of Representatives
 List of Massachusetts General Courts
 Massachusetts Government

Notes

References 

Representative Districts, accessed April 9, 2006
House Members of the General Court

Further reading
 
 
 1951, 1957, 1961, 1967,  1971, 1977,  1981, 1987, 1993, 1997, 2001, 2003, 2005, 2007
  (Per Chapter 11, Acts of 1988. Based on 1985 census)

External links
 

House of Representatives
 
State lower houses in the United States